Tyson St. James (born June 5, 1975) is a former Canadian football linebacker for the Saskatchewan Roughriders and Winnipeg Blue Bombers of the Canadian Football League. He was drafted first overall by the Roughriders in the 2000 CFL Draft. He played CIS football for the UBC Thunderbirds.

References

1975 births
Living people
Canadian football linebackers
UBC Thunderbirds football players
Players of Canadian football from British Columbia
Saskatchewan Roughriders players
Sportspeople from Nanaimo
Winnipeg Blue Bombers players